Simao may refer to:

Portuguese name
 Simão (footballer, born 1928), Brazilian footballer
 Simão Sabrosa (born 1979), Portuguese footballer
 Simão Mate Junior (born 1988), Mozambican footballer
 Miguel Simão (born 1973), former Portuguese footballer
 Ayres Cerqueira Simão (born 1988), Brazilian football player
 Simão Jatene (born 1949), Governor of the Brazilian state of Pará
 Simão Morgado (born 1979), male Portuguese swimmer
 Simão Rodrigues (1510–1579), was a Portuguese Jesuit priest
 Simão (Angolan footballer) (born 1976), Angolan football player
 Bruno Simão (born 1985), Portuguese football player
 David Simão (born 1990), Portuguese professional footballer
 Leonardo Simão (born 1953), Mozambican politician
 Paulo Simão (born 1976), Portuguese basketball player
 Simão (footballer, born 1968), Brazilian football defensive midfielder
 Simão (footballer, born 1984), Brazilian football attacking midfielder

Places
 São Simão, Goiás, Brazil
 São Simão, São Paulo, Brazil
 São Simão de Gouveia, Portugal
 Sarnadas de São Simão, Oleiros, Portugal
 São Simão de Litém, Pombal, Portugal
 São Simão, Nisa Portugal
 São Simão, Setúbal Portugal

Simao
 Simao District, in Pu'er City, Yunnan, China
 Samao, former name of Pu'er City, capital of Simao District

See also 
 Simon (disambiguation)

Portuguese-language surnames
Surnames of Portuguese origin
Portuguese masculine given names